Baron Coleridge, of Ottery St Mary in the County of Devon, is a title in the Peerage of the United Kingdom. It was created in 1874 for the prominent lawyer, judge and Liberal politician Sir John Coleridge. He served as Lord Chief Justice of England from 1880 to 1894. His son, the second Baron, represented Attercliffe in the House of Commons and served as a Judge of the High Court of Justice.  the title is held by the latter's great-grandson, the fifth Baron, who succeeded in 1984.

The first Baron was the son of Sir John Taylor Coleridge and the great-nephew of the poet Samuel Taylor Coleridge.

The ancestral home of the Coleridge family is The Chanter's House in Ottery St Mary. In October 2006 the increasing costs of maintaining the property caused the family trust to put the property up for sale and auction the contents.

Barons Coleridge (1874 onwards)
John Duke Coleridge, 1st Baron Coleridge (1821–1894)
Bernard John Seymour Coleridge, 2nd Baron Coleridge (1851–1927)
Geoffrey Duke Coleridge, 3rd Baron Coleridge (1877–1955)
Richard Duke Coleridge, 4th Baron Coleridge (1905–1984)
William Duke Coleridge, 5th Baron Coleridge (b. 1937)

The heir apparent is the present holder's only son The Hon. James Duke Coleridge (b. 1967)
The heir apparent's heir presumptive is his uncle Hon. Samuel John Taylor Coleridge (b. 1942)
Next in line is the present holder's cousin Syndercombe James Duke Coleridge (b. 1941), a grandson of the 3rd Baron. He has two sons, Robert James Duke (b. 1979) and Nicholas John (b. 1981).

Arms

Notes

References

Baronies in the Peerage of the United Kingdom
Noble titles created in 1874
Noble titles created for UK MPs
Coleridge family
People from Ottery St Mary